Benoît Ramampy (1947-1996) was a Malagasy film director.

Life
Ramampy was born in Ambalavao in 1947. He trained in Paris at the world music record label Ocora and Radio France. On his return to Madagascar, he studied at the Malagasy Production Centre.

His short film The Accident, about a son who tragically kills his father, won the award for best short film at the 4th FESPACO.

Films
 L'accident [The accident], 1972. Short film.
 Dahalo, Dahalo..., 1984. Feature film.
 The Price of Peace / Le Prix de la paix, 1987. Feature film.

References

Further reading

External links
 

1947 births
1996 deaths
Malagasy film directors
People from Haute Matsiatra